Deuteraphorura is a genus of  springtails belonging to the family Onychiuridae. There are 83 species in the genus.

Selected species
 Deuteraphorura acicindelia
 Deuteraphorura apuanica
 Deuteraphorura banii
 Deuteraphorura bergamaria
 Deuteraphorura bizkaiensis
 Deuteraphorura boneti
 Deuteraphorura bosnaria
 Deuteraphorura caprelleana
 Deuteraphorura cebennaria
 Deuteraphorura defensaria
 Deuteraphorura dianae
 Deuteraphorura difficilis
 Deuteraphorura doftana
 Deuteraphorura dunaria
 Deuteraphorura eduardi
 Deuteraphorura frasassii
 Deuteraphorura gangjinensis
 Deuteraphorura ghidinii
 Deuteraphorura gridellii
 Deuteraphorura handschini
 Deuteraphorura hategana
 Deuteraphorura hussoni
 Deuteraphorura imperfecta
 Deuteraphorura inermis
 Deuteraphorura insubraria
 Deuteraphorura koreana
 Deuteraphorura kratochvili
 Deuteraphorura lusa
 Deuteraphorura meziadica
 Deuteraphorura nervosa
 Deuteraphorura oregonensis
 Deuteraphorura ossaria
 Deuteraphorura pieroluccii - Italy
 Deuteraphorura pseudobosnaria
 Deuteraphorura pseudofimetaria
 Deuteraphorura pseudoghidinii
 Deuteraphorura pseudoinsubraria
 Deuteraphorura rendsinae
 Deuteraphorura romanica
 Deuteraphorura schoenviszkyi
 Deuteraphorura scotaria
 Deuteraphorura silesiaca
 Deuteraphorura spipolae
 Deuteraphorura silvaria
 Deuteraphorura variabilis
 Deuteraphorura vinuensis

References

Collembola
Cave arthropods